CBSSports.com (formerly CBS SportsLine.com and SportsLine USA) is an American sports news website operated by Paramount Streaming, itself a division of Paramount Global. It is the website for CBS's CBS Sports division that features news, highlights, analysis, and fantasy sports games.

History

SportsLine

In 1997, the service entered into a content-sharing partnership with Viacom. SportsLine also entered into agreements to operate official websites for the NCAA, NFL, and PGA Tour. The company later launched a co-branded website for CBS Sports (then owned by Viacom), CBSSportsLine

CBS purchase
In August 2004, already holding a 38% stake in the company, Viacom announced that it would acquire the remainder of SportsLine in a deal valued at $46 million ($1.75 per-share) and re-align it with the CBS Sports division (owing to Viacom's ownership of CBS at the time). The company originally operated as a division of CBS Sports, reporting to its president Sean McManus.

Fantasy Sports
CBSSports.com got into the fantasy sports business early on, producing games in 1997. In 1998, they partnered with Daedalus Worldwide Corporation, a producer of online fantasy sports products. In 1999, they would acquire Daedalus Worldwide Corporation, using their products as the basis of its fantasy sports business going forward. Initially, CBSSports.com charged a subscription fee to play its fantasy games. However, in July 2000 the company decided to drop all fees associated with its fantasy sports games and started offering the products free of charge. However, the move to free fantasy sports products did not last long as just two years later they switched back to a subscription-based model to run their fantasy sports business. Behind the popularity of the CBSSports.com Commissioner product, which has been voted the best fantasy sports league manager service by the FSTA in eight of the last nine years, fantasy sports are a significant portion of CBSSports.com's business.

In August 2015, the SportsLine brand was revived for a new subscription-based site featuring advanced statistics, sports betting and handicapping content. CBS continues to own the site.

Notable Accomplishments
November 6, 1995- SportsLine USA was ranked as the #1 sports service on the Web by Interactive Sports Wire. SportsLine USA received an overall rating of 86 percent, a full eight percent in front of ESPNet.
June 27, 1997- SportsLine USA, Inc., CEO Michael Levy was named 1997 Florida Entrepreneur of the Year by a panel representing Ernst & Young Entrepreneurial Services LLP. Levy, 50, won in the "Emerging" category for companies less than five years old.
March 9, 1998- SportsLine USA, Inc., publisher of CBS SportsLine (cbs.sportsline.com), the Internet's leading sports Web site, announced that CBS SportsLine was awarded the prestigious 1998 Webby Award in the sports category.
December 16, 1998- SportsLine USA, Inc. announced today that its popular CBS SportsLine Web site (cbs.sportsline.com) has been named "Best Sports Site" by NetGuide (www.netguide.com). NetGuide 99's "The Year's Best of the Web" recognizes exceptional sites in 22 separate categories ranging from Best Chat site to Best News site to Best Sports site.
September 26, 2000- Dennis Dodd, CBS SportsLine.com's college football senior writer, earned a first-place award in the annual Football Writers Association of America (FWAA) Best Writing Contest for the second consecutive year.
January 8, 2008- The winners of the 59th Annual Technology & Engineering Emmy Awards were announced and CBSSports.com and CBS Sports were honored for their production of March Madness on Demand, the online video experience that provides live streaming video of the NCAA Division I Men's Basketball Championship.
April 30, 2012- The winners of the 33rd Annual Sports Emmy Awards were announced and CBSSports.com was honored for its production of the Game of Honor Web Series.

News

Columnists
Pete Prisco- NFL
Jason La Canfora- NFL
Will Brinson- NFL
Jonathan Jones- NFL
Matt Norlander- College Basketball
Gary Parrish- College Basketball
Jerry Palm- College Sports
Matt Snyder- MLB
Dayn Perry- MLB
Mike Axisa- MLB
Kyle Porter- Golf
Jamey Eisenberg- Fantasy Football
Dave Richard- Fantasy Football
Scott White- Fantasy Baseball
Dennis Dodd- College Football

RapidReports
This news feature is updated in real time on cbssports.com consisting of 32 correspondents in each NFL city to report the news as it happens.

Awards

Freshman of the Year
Since 2006, the CBSSports.com Freshman of the Year award is given yearly to the top college football newcomer.
Previous Winners
 2010 - Marcus Lattimore, South Carolina
 2009 - Dion Lewis, Pitt
 2008 - Jacquizz Rodgers, Oregon State
 2007 - Michael Crabtree, Texas Tech
 2006 - P.J. Hill, Wisconsin

Fantasy

Traditional Games
 Free Leagues (NFL, NBA, NHL, MLB) - These free leagues, which are not eligible for league champion prizes, are aimed towards fantasy game beginners. 
 Premium Leagues (NFL, NBA, NHL, MLB) - These leagues are eligible for prizes, but are paid leagues.
 Commissioner Leagues (NFL, NBA, NHL, MLB) -These leagues, like others on different websites, are customizable.

Challenge Games/Brackets
 NFL Game Pick 'em Contest - Pick the winners of every NFL each week competing against experts or friends.
 Office Pool Manager - Choose picks with spreads, confidence weighting or in a survivor format
 Bracket Manager - Men's college basketball tournament bracket competition
 Round by Round Brackets - With each new round of the tournament, Round by Round brackets brings a new chance to make picks and win cash.

Awards from Fantasy Sports Trade Association (FSTA)
2001 Best Fantasy Football League Manager- CBS SportsLine.com commissioner
2001 Best Fantasy Football Big Business of the Year
2002 Best Fantasy Football League Manager
2002 Best Fantasy Baseball Commissioner Service
2003 Best Fantasy Baseball League Manager
2004 Best Commissioner
2004 Best Online Marketing Campaign
2006 Best Online Service
2008 Best Draft Style Contest
2009 Best Fantasy Commissioner League Management Product
2009 Best Online/Mock Draft Room
Lifetime Achievement Award- SportsLine.com Commissioner

Fantasy Writers
Jamey Eisenberg
Sergio Gonzalez
Michael Hurcomb
Jeff Lippman
Al Melchior
Dave Richard
Scott White
Nando Di Fino
David Kelly

References

External links

American sport websites
CBS Interactive websites
CBS Sports